The 1994 Tour du Haut Var was the 26th edition of the Tour du Haut Var cycle race and was held on 19 February 1994. The race started in Fréjus and finished in Draguignan. The race was won by Laurent Brochard.

General classification

References

1994
1994 in road cycling
1994 in French sport
February 1994 sports events in Europe